Son Hyun-Jun (손현준, born. March 20, 1972, in South Korea) is a retired South Korean footballer, who played most of his club football for the Anyang LG Cheetahs. He later managed several football teams, including Daegu FC.

Player career 
 1995-1998 : LG Cheetahs / Anyang LG Cheetahs
 1999 : Pusan Daewoo Royals
 2000-2003 : Anyang LG Cheetahs

Managerial career  
He was FC Seoul reserve team coach in 2005 and appointed Daegu FC scouter in 2006, December. From 2016 to 2017 he was manager of Daegu FC, initially in a caretaker capacity.

References

 

1972 births
Living people
South Korean footballers
South Korean football managers
FC Seoul players
FC Seoul non-playing staff
Busan IPark players
K League 1 players
Daegu FC managers
Association football defenders